The 1986–87 season was the 17th season of the Portland Trail Blazers in the National Basketball Association (NBA).  The Blazers finished 49–33, third in the Western Conference, qualifying for the playoffs for the fifth consecutive year.

In the 1987 NBA Playoffs, despite having home-court advantage, the Blazers lost their first-round best-of-five series to the Houston Rockets, three games to one.

Draft picks

Note:  This is not a complete list; only the first two rounds are covered, as well as notable post-second round picks.

Roster

Regular season

Season standings

z – clinched division title
y – clinched division title
x – clinched playoff spot

Record vs. opponents

Game log

Playoffs

|- align="center" bgcolor="#ffcccc"
| 1
| April 24
| Houston
| L 115–125
| Kiki VanDeWeghe (30)
| Clyde Drexler (13)
| Terry Porter (11)
| Memorial Coliseum12,666
| 0–1
|- align="center" bgcolor="#ccffcc"
| 2
| April 26
| Houston
| W 111–98
| Clyde Drexler (32)
| Porter, Johnson (8)
| Terry Porter (15)
| Memorial Coliseum12,666
| 1–1
|- align="center" bgcolor="#ffcccc"
| 3
| April 28
| @ Houston
| L 108–117
| Clyde Drexler (26)
| Johnson, Jones (10)
| Terry Porter (8)
| The Summit16,279
| 1–2
|- align="center" bgcolor="#ffcccc"
| 4
| April 30
| @ Houston
| L 101–113
| Kiki VanDeWeghe (27)
| Steve Johnson (12)
| Terry Porter (6)
| The Summit16,279
| 1–3
|-

Player statistics

Season

Playoffs

Awards and honors
 Mike Schuler, NBA Coach of the Year

Transactions

References

Portland Trail Blazers seasons
Portland Trail Blazers 1986
Portland Trail Blazers 1987
Port
Portland
Portland